The following is a list of US Open champions in tennis:

Champions

Senior

Wheelchair

Junior

‡ = a player who won both the junior and senior title.

† = a player who won the junior title and reached the senior final.

See also

Lists of champions of specific events
List of US Open men's singles champions
List of US Open women's singles champions
List of US Open men's doubles champions
List of US Open women's doubles champions
List of US Open mixed doubles champions

Other Grand Slam tournament champions
List of Australian Open champions
List of French Open champions
List of Wimbledon champions